14 Carrot Rabbit is a 1952 Warner Bros. Looney Tunes animated cartoon short directed by Friz Freleng. The short was released on March 15, 1952, and features Bugs Bunny and Yosemite Sam. The title is a play on "14 karat", as in a purity level for gold.

Plot
14 Carrot Rabbit takes place during the Klondike Gold Rush (1896-1899) in Yukon, Canada and centers on Yosemite Sam (here as Chilkoot Sam) who steals other people's gold. The story begins with an old man named Louie slouching by a river, washing the gold he has in a pan. Sam suddenly appears, using his guns and reputation to scare Louie off and claim the gold.  When he sees how little he has actually stolen from the old prospector, Sam says, "Pickings mighty slim around here, hardly no reward for a day's work." Sam takes the gold to Pierre, who runs the "Next to Last Chance Saloon", to trade it for money. After the weigh-up, Sam is furious to find out that Pierre can offer him only $10 for the gold.

While Sam complains about this ("It's getting so a man can't earn a dishonest living!"), Bugs Bunny wobbles into the shop carrying a gigantic piece of gold. Pierre's comments to Bugs indicate that this is not the first time he has brought in such a chunk. In lieu of cash, Bugs gets paid off in carrots. Sam, speechless, watches Bugs leave; Pierre explains that Bugs always gets a "funny feeling" when he is near gold.

Armed with this information and eager to pursue his own underhanded ambition, Sam goes after Bugs, whom he manages to secretly observe to get that "funny feeling". Bugs starts digging, only to unearth a lost collar button, which he discards. Sam then reveals himself and suggests that the two of them become partners. When Bugs locates gold, Sam will dig it up and split it with the rabbit in a 50/50 deal. Bugs looks at the camera and wiggles his eyebrows with a smirk, demonstrating that he is not taken in by the conniving Sam. Bugs plays along by asking if the deal is "honest and for true", to which the claim-jumper replies, "Square-Deal Sam, they call me". They stroll off together and soon Bugs, in his unusual way, indicates that he has found gold. He points out the spot to Sam, who proceeds to dig and abruptly reveals that he dissolves his partnership with Bugs. The double-crossed Bugs notices that Sam is about to dig through a cliff and into a lake hundreds of feet down. Bugs feels he cannot "do that to the little guy" and tries to warn Sam, but he yells at him to shut up. His conscience clear, Bugs chews on a carrot as Sam indeed digs through the cliff and plummets down into the lake.

Bugs heads downhill, knowing Sam will show up shortly. When Bugs hears him coming, he starts digging before Sam immediately accuses Bugs of trying to get the gold for himself, grabs the shovel and tries attacking him with it as he digs while hypocritically complaining, "That's what I get for trusting a rabbit". As the thief digs even deeper, it turns out he is in a loaded dump truck. Bugs drives the dump truck to a cliff and empties the load over the edge. Oblivious, Sam keeps digging until he finds himself upside down, gazing out from the bottom of the falling soil pile and complains ("Great horny toadies! I must've dug clean through to Chinee!") His fall is broken by the hard ground.

Enraged, Sam vows to chase Bugs through every state in the Union, and literally does, until the rabbit suddenly has another "funny" moment. In spite of thinking Bugs is tricking him again, Sam cannot resist the desire to dig for gold. He does so and indeed finds tons of it as 24-karat bars. However, it turns out that Sam has dug into the United States Gold Reserve in Fort Knox, Kentucky. Caught in the act, Sam is arrested and hauled off to the stockade by a couple of Military Policemen while Bugs bids him farewell. A third Military Policeman appears behind and demands an explanation from Bugs about his presence on the gold reserve area. Bugs nervously explains that he is waiting for a streetcar. The officer replies with a skeptical "Oh, yeah?" and stands ready to arrest Bugs. At that moment, an ocean liner spontaneously appears on the scene. Bugs is not stymied and remarks to the officer, ("But, in a spot like this, a boat will do!") With that, Bugs rushes aboard to make his getaway.

See also
 Looney Tunes and Merrie Melodies filmography (1950–1959)
 List of Bugs Bunny cartoons
 List of Yosemite Sam cartoons

References

External links

 
 

1952 films
1952 animated films
1952 short films
Short films directed by Friz Freleng
Looney Tunes shorts
Warner Bros. Cartoons animated short films
Films scored by Carl Stalling
Films set in the 1890s
Films set in Kentucky
Films set in Yukon
Bugs Bunny films
Films about the Klondike Gold Rush
1950s Warner Bros. animated short films
Yosemite Sam films
1950s English-language films